Jeremy Paul (29 July 1939 - 3 May 2011) was a British film and television writer.

Biography
He was born Jeremy Paul Roche on 29 July 1939 in Bexhill, East Sussex, the son of the actress Joan Haythorne.

Alan Gibson came up with the idea for The Flipside of Dominick Hide (1980), a Play for Today he co-wrote with Jeremy Paul and directed. They collaborated again on its sequel, Another Flip for Dominick (1982).

He co-wrote the song Mistletoe and Wine, which was a Christmas No 1 for Cliff Richard in 1988.

Selected film (as writer)
 Countess Dracula (1971)

Selected television (as writer)
 Out of the Unknown (1969)
 Upstairs, Downstairs (1971–75)
 The Duchess of Duke Street (1976–77)
 The Flipside of Dominick Hide (1980)
 Another Flip for Dominick (1982)
 Sherlock Holmes (1984-1994)
 Campion (1989-1990)

References

External links
 

1939 births
2011 deaths
British male screenwriters
British television writers
People from Bexhill-on-Sea
British male television writers